Portrait of Louis-Auguste Schwiter is an 1826-1830 portrait by Eugène Delacroix of the son of Henri César Auguste Schwiter. It was once owned by Edgar Degas and was acquired in 1918 by the National Gallery, London, where it still hangs.

References

1820s paintings
Schwiter
19th-century portraits
Collections of the National Gallery, London
Paintings by Eugène Delacroix